Muse Entertainment is a Canadian producer of films and television programs founded by Michael Prupas in 1998. The company gained press attention in 2011 for their production of the multi-Emmy winning and nominated miniseries The Kennedys in association with Asylum Entertainment.

Products 
Muse Entertainment Enterprises produces dramatic series, television films, mini-series and family programs. The sales arm of Muse Entertainment is Muse Distribution, delivering television programming and feature films internationally to broadcasters, cable and pay networks, theatrical, VOD, SVOD, video, iTunes, and DVD distributors around the world.

Muse has a large volume of projects in development and in production with free and cable television networks in the United States as a result of the opening of Muse's Los Angeles offices in 2007.

Muse has become one of the most active companies in the world in co producing television projects with international partners.

Under Canada's official film production treaties, Muse has produced with companies in France, the United Kingdom, Ireland, Spain, Germany, Switzerland, Romania, Hungary, Morocco, Australia and South Africa.

Muse's productions include two made-for-television films funded by Procter & Gamble and Walmart and aired on NBC as a time buy: Secrets of the Mountain and The Jensen Project.

Staff
Muse staff specializes in project development, production, post production, publicity, legal and business affairs, financial structuring, tax credit collection, government and union relations, internet and multi-media as well as sales and distribution.

Michael Prupas is Muse Entertainment's founder, president, CEO and chairman of the board. Joel Rice is president of Muse Entertainment USA division, Jesse Prupas is vice-president of development and distribution, and Irene Litinsky is the head of production in Quebec. Lydia Storie is vice president of development and Meghan Mathes is director of development for the company's Los Angeles expansion.

Productions

Theatrical 

 Flood
 I'm Not There
 The Deal
 Blades of Glory
 The Fountain (2006)
 Niagara Motel
 Savage Messiah
 The Guilty
 The Tracker
 Savage Messiah (2002)

Television

Films 
 Rise of the Gargoyles
 Hellhounds
 Taking a Chance on Love
 Sand Serpents
 Carny
 High Plains Invaders
 Unstable
 Swamp Devil (2008)
 The Christmas Choir (2008)
 The Watch (2008)
 An Old Fashioned Thanksgiving
 Accidental Friendship
 Black Swarm
 Dr. Jekyll and Mr.Hyde
 Infected
 Girl's Best Friend
 I Me Wed
 Too Young To Marry
 The Wind in the Willows (2006)
 The House Sitter
 The House Next Door
 Tipping Point
 Proof of Lies
 Answered by Fire (2006)
 Recipe for a Perfect Christmas
 Black Widower
 Mind Over Murder
 Murder in the Hamptons
 Plain Truth (film) (2004)
 Icebound (2003)
 Silent Night (2002)
 Deadly Friends
 Infected (2008)
 Cyberbully (2011)
 Picking Up & Dropping Off
 The Many Trials of One Jane Doe (2002)
 The Clinic (2004)
 The Stork Derby (2002)
 The Investigation (2002 film)The Investigation (2002)
 Chasing Cain: Face (2002)
 The Hound of the Baskervilles (2000)
 The Royal Scandal (2001)
 The Sign of Four (1984)
 The Case of the Whitechapel Vampire (2002)
 The Legend of Sleepy Hollow (1999)
 The Death and Life of Nancy Eaton (2003)
 Icebound (2003)
 Ricky Nelson: Original Teen Idol (1999)
 Class Warfare
 The Stalking of Laurie Show
 Daydream Believers: The Monkees' Story (2000)
 The Wool Cap (2004)

Series 
 Coroner
 Bellevue (2017)
 Collision Course (2016-)
 Twice in a Lifetime (1999-2001)
 Bomb Girls
 Being Human
 Bounty Hunters
 Crusoe
 Durham County (2007-2010)
 Family Biz
 Gawayn
 Hubworld
 Largo Winch
 The Mysteries of Alfred Hedgehog
 See Robin Jones
 Tales from the Neverending Story
 This Is Wonderland (2004-2006)
 Doc (2001–2004)
 The Tournament (2005-2006)

Mini-series 
 The Kennedys: After Camelot (2017)
 10.5: Apocalypse
 Answered by Fire
 Ben Hur
 Cat. 8
 Exploding Sun
 Flood
 Human Trafficking (2005)
 Impact (2009)
 Killer Wave
 The Kennedys
 The Last Templar
 The Pillars of the Earth
 The Phantom
 Tut
 University (2001)

Non-fiction 
 For Heaven's Sake
 Human Nature
 March to the Top
 Rocksteady: The Roots of Reggae
 Rudy: The Rudy Giuliani Story (2003)
 Trump Unauthorized (2005)
 I'm Not There (2007)

Product recognition

Awards and nominations 

 This Is Wonderland
 Won four Gemini awards for actors Michael Murphy (won twice), Cara Pifko, and Michael Riley
 Won WCC Award for Best Dramatic Series, George F. Walker, Dani Romain
 Nominated for 38 Gemini awards over three seasons
 Nominated for 3 DGC Craft Awards
 Nominated for Golden Nymph award for best dramatic series at Monte Carlo Television Festival
 The Legend of Sleepy Hollow
 Nominated for 3 Gemini Awards
 Nominated for CSC award for 'Best Cinematography'
 The Wind in the Willows
 Won Leo Award for Best Direction in Youth or Children’s Program or Series, Rachel Talalay
 Nominated for Satellite Award, Best Motion Picture Made for Television
 Nominated for Gemini award – Best Direction
 The Royal Scandal
 Nominated for Gemini Award for Best Costume Design
 Nominated for CSC for Best Cinematography
 The Case of the Whitechapel Vampire
 Nominated for both CSC and ASC awards for Best Cinematography
 Twice in a Lifetime
 Won Gold Plaque Special Achievement in Direction, for David Winning at Chicago International Film Festival
 Won Gold Plaque, Best Direction Variety/Entertainment, for David Winning at Chicago International Film Festival
 Won Outstanding Achievement in a Television Series for Drama by DGC
 Nominated for 5 Gemini Awards including as Best Dramatic Television Series
 Nominated for DGC Craft Award for Direction
 Nominated for 3 Young Artist Awards
 Tales from the Neverending Story
 Won Grand Prize for Best Program Award of Excellence 2003 from Alliance for Children and Television
 Won Award of Excellence, Ages 9-12 Category from Alliance for Children and Television
 Won Gemini Award for Best Costume Design
 Nominated for 4 Gemini Awards
 Nominated for Young Artist Award
 The Stork Derby
 Nominated for Gemini Award for Best Supporting Actress for Pascale Montpetit
 Nominated for 2 Golden Reel Awards
 The Many Trials of One Jane Doe
 Won 4 Gemini Awards, including best actress Wendy Crewson, Director Jerry Ciccoritti, Screenwriter Karen Walton, and Picture Editor George Roulston
 Won DGC Craft Award for Picture Editing
 Nominated for 5 Gemini Awardx, including Best TV Movie
 Nominated for DGC Craft Award for Best Direction for Jerry Ciccoritti
 Chasing Cain: Face (2002)
 Nominated for 5 Gemini Awards, including Best TV Movie
 Silent Night
 Nominated for 4 Gemini Awards' including Best Direction, Rodney Gibbons
 The Hound of the Baskervilles
 Nominated for Gemini Award for Best Costume Design
 The Royal Scandal
 Nominated for Gemini Award for Best Costume Design
 Nominated for CSC Award for Best Cinematography
 Savage Messiah
 Won 3 Genie Awards, Best Actor for Luc Picard, Best Screenwriter for Sharon Riis and Best Supporting Actress Pascale Montpetit
 Nominated for 7 Genie Awards and one DGC nomination for Best Direction- for Mario Azzopardi
 Plain Truth
 Won DGC Award for Sound Editing
 Nominated for 3 DGC awards
 Icebound
 Nominated for Golden Reel Award
 The Death and Life of Nancy Eaton
 Won Gemini Award for Best Actor for Brendan Fletcher
 Nominated for 2 Gemini Awards
 Nominated for CSC, Best Cinematography in TV Drama
 The Investigation
 Won WGC Award for Writer for Bruce M. Smith
 Nominated for 2 Gemini Awards
 Answered by Fire
 Won Silver Hugo, Television Drama Mini-Series, from Chicago International Television Awards.
 Won 2006 "Reflect d'Or" (Best Collection & Long Drama) at Geneva International Film Festival Tous Ecrans
 Won 2006 SPAA Award for Television Drama, from Screen Producers Association of Australia
 Won 2006 Silver Prize, for Teleseries, Series and Miniseries Category, from Australian Cinematographers Society for Mark Wareham
 Won 2006 Best Director (Television Category) from Australian Film Institute for Jessica Hobbs
 Won 2006 Best Actor (Television Category) from Australian Film Institute for David Wenham
 Won 2006 Best Miniseries Script (Best Script Across all Genres), and Gold AWGIE from Australian Writers’ Guild for Barbara Samuels and Katherine Thomson
 Won Best Editing, Gemini Award for Dominique Fortin
 Nominations for Gemini Awards (Canada)
 Human Trafficking
 Won 3 Gemini Awards, including Best Dramatic Mini-Series
 Won 3 DGC Awards including Outstanding Direction for Christian Duguay
 Nominated for 3 Emmy Awards
 Nominated for 2 Golden Globes, Best Actor got Donald Sutherland and Best Actress for Mira Sorvino
 Nominated for 5 Gemini Awards
 University (2001)
 Won WGC Award for Writer Bruce M. Smith
 The Tournament (2005-2006)
 Won Gemini Award for Best Editing
 Nominated for 5 Gemini Awards including Best Ensemble
 Doc (2001–2004)
 Nominated for 4 Gemini Awards
 Nominated for 9 Young Artist Awards
 The Fountain
 Won DGC Craft Award for Sound Editing
 Won CFCA for Best Music Score
 Nominated for Golden Globe for Best Original Score
 Nominated for Golden Lion for Darren Aronofsky at Venice Film Festival
 Nominated for 2 Satellite Awards
 Rudy: The Rudy Giuliani Story
 Won 2 Golden Satellite Awards, including Best Motion Picture Made for Television
 Nominated for 2 Emmys, including Best Actor for James Woods
 The Wool Cap (2004)
 Nominated for Golden Globe Best Actor for William H. Macy
 Nominated for 4 Emmys, including Outstanding Made for Television Movie
 Nominated for Critics Choice Award for Best Picture Made for Television
 Nominated for 2 Screen Actors Guild Awards
 Nominated for WGA Award for TV, William H. Macy and Steven Schachter
 Trump Unauthorized
 Nominated for Golden Reel for Best Sound Editing
 I'm Not There
 Won Golden Globe Best Supporting Actress for Cate Blanchett
 Won Robert Altman Award, Independent Spirit Awards
 Won CFCA Award Best Supporting Actress for Cate Blanchett
 Won Volpi Cup Best Actress for Cate Blanchett at Venice Film Festival
 Won CinemAwenire Award Best Film at Venice Film Festival
 Won Special Jury Prize for Todd Haynes at Venice Film Festival
 Nominated for Oscar Best Supporting Actress for Cate Blanchett
 Nominated for 5 Independent Spirit Awards
 Nominated for Golden Lion for Todd Haynes at Venice Film Festival
 Nominated for Critics Choice Award Best Supporting Actress for Cate Blanchett
 Nominated for Satellite Award
 Nominated for Screen Actors Guild Award
 Accidental Friendship
 Nominated for Emmy in the category of Outstanding Lead Actress In A Miniseries Or A Movie for Chandra Wilson
 Swamp Devil
 Won the Best Feature Film award at Burbank International Film Festival.
 Won Best Director for David Winning
 Nominated Best Original Score at Burbank International Film Festival for composer James Gelfand
 Won 2009 Television Programming Awards Gold World Medal for Best Direction at the New York Festival
 Won 2008 Best Foreign Feature film award at Big Island Film Festival
 Won the Platinum award for Directing at Houston International Film Festival
 Won 2008 The Audience Favorite award at Philadelphia Terror Film Festival
 Won 2008 Best Supporting Actor award for Bruce Dern at Philadelphia Terror Film Festival
 Impact
 Nominated for four Leo Awards including: Best Cinematography, Best Sound Editing, Best Musical Score and Best Visual Effects
 The Christmas Choir
 Won 2008 America's Epiphany Prize for the most inspiring television movie or mini series
 Durham County
 Won five Canadian Gemini Awards, 2 DGC Awards and the CFTPA Indie Award for ‘Best Series’

References

External links
 

Film production companies of Canada
Television production companies of Canada
Canadian companies established in 1998
Mass media companies established in 1998
Procter & Gamble
Companies based in Montreal